Chwilog is a village in Eifionydd on the Llŷn Peninsula in the Welsh county of Gwynedd.  It forms part of the community of Llanystumdwy. The name means 'abounding in beetles' and was perhaps transferred from an earlier name of the river (or a part of it).

It had a population of 640 as of the 2011 UK census, with 78% born in Wales.

Village
The village is fairly linear, built up around the B4354 which used to be a turnpike/toll road crossing the peninsula to Porthdinllaen.

Y Lôn Goed

Nearby is Y Lôn Goed, a tree-lined path, first nicknamed by the local population, then  made well known due to its reference in "Eifionydd" a poem by R. Williams Parry. It was originally named 'Ffordd Maughan' (Maughan Way) after John Maughan, land commissioner for Sir Thomas Mostyn (1817-1828). It is a wide tree-lined avenue created in the 18th century for transporting lime from the coast to the upland farms of Eifionydd. The track is no longer used for this purpose but is now popular with walkers.

Talhenbont
Talhenbont Hall is a Grade II listed manor house. It was a property formerly 'Plas Han' before its renaming in the 20th century by the daughter of Hugh Ellis-Nanney who owned the property via inheritance. Originally owned by Gruffydd ap John ap Grono and passed to Robert 'Fychan' in the late 15th century, the property passed through marriage, and by 1607 the new home of William Vaughan was built. In 1642, the owner William Lloyd was arrested as a Royalist sympathiser as Cromwell's men took over the Hall, and then the hall was used as headquarters for the Royalists under John Owen (Royalist). In 1758 Talhenbont was the largest single owned piece of land in the district of Eifionydd. The estate was occupied by Sir Thomas Mostyn, the sixth baronet, from 1796.  In 1884 the estate was split into sections to pay off debts that had crept up during the Napoleonic Wars.  It is now operated as a holiday centre.

Amenities 
Chwilog Primary School was opened in 1908 by Margaret Lloyd George, wife of David Lloyd George. The village was built around the railway station on the Caernarfonshire Railway Line situated at the centre of the village, it opened in 1867 and has been disused since December 1964. Local businesses include a butcher's shop, and also a tractor sales outlet. The village pub, the Madryn Arms (est. 1868), had been permanently closed in 2019, and has since been reopened by a locals.

The village is served by one main bus route - the number 3 from Pwllheli to Porthmadog - and is run jointly by Arriva Cymru and Caelloi.
On Mondays to Saturdays there is also an hourly 3b service that runs on to Blaenau Ffestiniog until very late evening. On Sundays though there are just 6 journeys each way per day and only up to 18.30.

References

External links 

Villages in Gwynedd
Llanystumdwy